Olga Sergeyevna Kuzenkova (born 4 October 1970 in Smolensk) is a Russian track and field athlete, the first woman to throw the hammer more than 70 meters. She has tested positive for doping.

She won gold in the women's hammer throw event at the 2004 Summer Olympics in Athens.

She trained with Aleksandr Seleznyov.

Doping
In December 2012, her samples from the 2004 Olympics were retested, and she tested positive for anabolic steroids; subsequently she was under investigation by the International Amateur Athletics Federation.
In 2013, samples from the 2005 World Championships were retested and Kuzenkova was found to have been doping there as well. In March 2013, she was banned from competitions for two years.

International competitions

See also
List of doping cases in athletics
List of Olympic medalists in athletics (women)
List of World Athletics Championships medalists (women)
List of European Athletics Championships medalists (women)
List of Australian athletics champions (women)
List of 2004 Summer Olympics medal winners
List of 2000 Summer Olympics medal winners
List of hammer throwers
List of masters athletes
List of Russian sportspeople
Hammer throw at the Olympics
Russia at the World Athletics Championships
Doping at the World Athletics Championships

References

1970 births
Living people
Sportspeople from Smolensk
Russian female hammer throwers
Olympic athletes of Russia
Olympic gold medalists for Russia
Olympic silver medalists for Russia
Olympic gold medalists in athletics (track and field)
Olympic silver medalists in athletics (track and field)
Athletes (track and field) at the 2000 Summer Olympics
Athletes (track and field) at the 2004 Summer Olympics
Medalists at the 2000 Summer Olympics
Medalists at the 2004 Summer Olympics
Goodwill Games medalists in athletics
Competitors at the 1998 Goodwill Games
Competitors at the 2001 Goodwill Games
Universiade silver medalists for Russia
Universiade medalists in athletics (track and field)
Medalists at the 1997 Summer Universiade
World Athletics Championships athletes for Russia
World Athletics Championships medalists
Athletes stripped of World Athletics Championships medals
European Athletics Championships winners
European Athletics Championships medalists
CIS Athletics Championships winners
Russian Athletics Championships winners
Australian Athletics Championships winners
World record setters in athletics (track and field)
Doping cases in athletics
Russian sportspeople in doping cases